Aloha Township is a civil township of Cheboygan County in the U.S. state of Michigan. As of the 2020 census, the township population was 937.

Communities
Aloha State Park is just to the south. The settlement formed around the James B. Patterson sawmill and the F. Hout general store. It was a station on the Detroit and Mackinac Railway, now the North Eastern State Trail. The name was selected by mill owner Patterson, who had made a trip to Hawaii. A post office opened on December 17, 1903, with Lillian Hout as the first postmaster. The post office closed on October 12, 1942.

Geography

Demographics
As of the census of 2000, there were 1,041 people, 423 households, and 321 families residing in the township. There were 670 housing units at an average density of 22.8 per square mile (8.8/km2). The racial makeup of the township was 95.29% White, 2.50% Native American, 0.38% Asian, 0.10% from other races, and 1.73% from two or more races. Hispanic or Latino of any race were 0.38% of the population.

There were 423 households, out of which 27.0% had children under the age of 18 living with them, 70.0% were married couples living together, 3.5% had a female householder with no husband present, and 23.9% were non-families. 19.9% of all households were made up of individuals, and 9.5% had someone living alone who was 65 years of age or older.  The average household size was 2.45 and the average family size was 2.80.

In the township the population was spread out, with 23.8% under the age of 18, 3.8% from 18 to 24, 23.0% from 25 to 44, 30.7% from 45 to 64, and 18.6% who were 65 years of age or older.  The median age was 45 years. For every 100 females, there were 105.3 males.  For every 100 females age 18 and over, there were 106.5 males.

The median income for a household in the township was $34,853, and the median income for a family was $41,406. Males had a median income of $32,955 versus $22,206 for females. The per capita income for the township was $18,656.  About 9.6% of families and 13.9% of the population were below the poverty line, including 17.1% of those under age 18 and 8.9% of those age 65 or over.

References

External links
Aloha Township official website

Townships in Cheboygan County, Michigan
Townships in Michigan